John Kolb is currently a Republican member of the Wyoming Senate representing District 12 since January 4, 2021.

Career
Kolb is a businessman that has previously served as county commissioner. On November 3, 2020, Kolb defeated the incumbent Democrat state senator, Liisa Anselmi-Dalton for the Wyoming Senate seat representing the 12th district. Kolb was sworn in as State Senator on January 4, 2021.

References

Living people
Businesspeople from Wyoming
County commissioners in Wyoming
People from Sweetwater County, Wyoming
Republican Party Wyoming state senators
21st-century American politicians
Year of birth missing (living people)